The first Croatian Buddhist group was founded in Zagreb in the 80's. Several groups have formed since, affiliated with different traditions. Estimates of the number of Buddhists in Croatia vary from 500 to 1000, depending on the definition. At present, active Buddhist groups are working to establish foundational practices and communities in major cities. Traditions represented presently are Nyingma and Rime (nonsectarian) of Tibetan Buddhism, Shingon and Zen of Japanese Buddhism, and Ch'an of Chinese Buddhism.

References

External links

Dharma Centers
Buddhactivity Dharma Centres database
Dharmaloka Buddhist Community
Mandala society
Shechen society
Padmasana society
NKT - site of the New Kadampa Tradition in Croatia

Croatia
Buddhism
Cro